Gourma-Rharous  is a rural commune and small town in the Tombouctou Region of Mali. The town is the administrative center (Chef-lieu) of the Gourma-Rharous Cercle and lies on the right bank of the Niger River 110 km east of Timbuktu. The commune has an area of approximately 7,000 km2 and contains 29 villages. In the census of 2009 it had a population of 26,115. French singer Daniel Balavoine died in a helicopter crash in Gourma-Rharous as he was leading a fund-raising effort in Africa during the 1986 Dakar Rally.

References

Communes of Tombouctou Region
Communities on the Niger River